Balaka may refer to:

 Balaka (Bengali poetry), by Rabindranath Tagore
 Balaka District in Southern Region, Malawi
 Balaka Township, Malawi, a city in the aforementioned district
 Balaka (plant), a genus of palm trees
 Biman Bangladesh Airlines
 Balaka Cineworld, a movie theater in Bangladesh

See also
 Anti-balaka, an alliance of militia groups based in the Central African Republic